The Híjar Synagogue is a surviving, pre-expulsion synagogue building in the city of Híjar, Aragon, Spain.

Since the expulsion of the Jews from Spain it has been in use as the Church of San Antón in Híjar. The Jewish community in Híjar is known to have numbered 32 families as late 1481, after a series of pogroms and partial expulsions. Before the expulsion in 1492, the Jewish community of Híjar was noted for craftsmen expert in  parchment-making  and bookbinding.  Híjar was also an early center for Hebrew printing.

The building is one of the best-preserved synagogue buildings on the Iberian peninsula, after the synagogues of Toledo, Córdoba and Tomar.

References

15th-century synagogues
Synagogues in Spain
Museums in Aragon